The Oscar season is the time period in which Hollywood studios release or promote the films they consider most likely to be critically acclaimed, hoping to win at the Academy Awards. Oscar season usually begins in the late-fall and early-winter, around November, and ends on December 31 of that year, although the date in which the summer blockbuster season ends, and the Oscar season begins, are ambiguous, and dependent on the year.

Origins
The Academy Awards occur every late February and films that win awards typically see a boost in sales. To take advantage of this, the studios release films they deem "Oscar worthy" in the fall, before the eligibility cut-off, so that the films remain fresh in the memories of critics and Academy members right before the Awards, increasing their chances of being nominated.

Campaigning
During Oscar season, studios heavily campaign for their films to win, spending large amounts of money in an attempt to influence Academy voters. Harvey Weinstein, of Miramax, was especially notorious for his campaigning. Weinstein was alleged to have spread rumors that John Nash was antisemitic, to hurt the chances of A Beautiful Mind, which was competing for the awards with the Miramax film In the Bedroom.  It was also suspected, although unproven, that Weinstein was involved with the nomination of The Reader in 2009, a film that received mixed reviews from critics.

The Oscars represent a rare slice of Hollywood where independent film distributors with their moderate and low-budget films can best the major studios and their blockbusters. Because Oscar voters gravitate to serious content that is abundant in indie films, the glossy major-studio films are usually passed over. The awards campaigns involve placed advertising labeled with the subtle “for your consideration”, talent appearances in industry seminars, by-invitation parties, soliciting press coverage, screenings of films in theaters, online or via mailed DVDs, and direct email and print mail marketing messages to voters. The Academy of Motion Picture Arts & Sciences that confers the Oscars also sets rules limiting overt campaigning by its members, which the movie industry generally complies with.

The studio head is usually personally responsible in campaigning for the studio's films. This comes in the form of hosting celebrity-filled private parties for "friends" before the Awards. The CEO of Universal Studios, Ronald Meyer, for example, attempted to influence Academy members—such as Ron Howard, Brian Grazer, and Frank Langella—by hosting a cocktail party at Nobu West.

See also
Dump months
Oscar bait
Film awards seasons
2016–17 film awards season
2017–18 film awards season

References

Academy Awards
Film and video terminology
November events
December events
January events
February events